Radek Štěpánek was the defending champion, but lost in the second round to Philipp Kohlschreiber.

Mikhail Youzhny won in the final 6–2, 6–4, against Ivan Ljubičić.

Seeds

Draw

Finals

Top half

Bottom half

External links
Main Draw
Qualifying draw

Singles
2007 ATP Tour